SVF or SvF can refer to:
Serial Vector Format, used in boundary scan tests of electronics
Shree Venkatesh Films, an Indian media and entertainment company headquartered in Kolkata, West Bengal
Södra Vätterbygdens folkhögskola
Squamish volcanic field
State variable filter
Stoicorum Veterum Fragmenta, a commonly cited philosophical reference, edited by Hans Friedrich August von Arnim
Stromal vascular fraction
SVF Foundation